Participatory 3D modelling (P3DM) is a community-based mapping method which integrates local spatial knowledge with data on elevation of the land and depth of the sea to produce stand-alone, scaled and geo-referenced relief models. Essentially based on local spatial knowledge, land use and cover, and other features are depicted by informants on the model by the use of pushpins (points), yarns (lines) and paints (polygons). On completion, a scaled and geo-referenced grid is applied to facilitate data extraction or importation. Data depicted on the model are extracted, digitised and plotted. On completion of the exercise the model remains with the community.

Awards
On November 5, 2007 at a ceremony which took place during the Global Forum 2007 at the Fondazione Giorgio Cini in Venice, Italy, the CTA-supported project Participatory 3D Modelling (P3DM) for Resource Use, Development Planning and Safeguarding Intangible Cultural Heritage in Fiji was granted the World Summit Award 2007 in the category e-culture. The product, based on the use of P3DM, has been considered as one of the 40 best practice examples of quality e-Content in the world 
. The product has been delivered by the following organizations: Fiji Locally-Managed Marine Area (FLMMA) Network, WWF South Pacific Programme, Native Lands Trust Board, Secretariat of the Pacific Community, National Trust of Fiji, Lomaiviti Provincial Council and the Technical Centre for Agricultural and Rural Cooperation ACP-EU (CTA).

See also
Geographic information system (GIS)
Neogeography
Participatory GIS (PGIS) or public participation geographic information system (PPGIS)
Raised-relief map
Traditional knowledge GIS

References

Further reading
 Rambaldi G., Muchemi J., Crawhall N. and Monaci L. 2007. Through the Eyes of Hunter-gatherers: Participatory 3D Modelling among Ogiek Indigenous Peoples in Kenya. Information Development, Vol. 23, No. 2-3, 113–128 
 Rambaldi G., Kwaku Kyem A. P.; Mbile P.; McCall M. and Weiner D. 2006. Participatory Spatial Information Management and Communication in Developing Countries. EJISDC 25, 1, 1–9 .
 Chambers R. 2006. Participatory Mapping and Geographic Information Systems: Whose Map? Who is Empowered and Who Disempowered? Who Gains and Who Loses? EJISDC 25, 2, 1–11
 Rambaldi G, Chambers R., McCall M, And Fox J. 2006. Practical ethics for PGIS practitioners, facilitators, technology intermediaries and researchers. PLA 54:106–113, IIED, London, UK
 Corbett J, Rambaldi G., Kyem P., Weiner D., Olson R., Muchemi J., McCall M And Chambers R. 2006. Mapping for Change: The emergence of a new practice. PLA 54:13–19 IIED, London, UK
 Rambaldi G., Bugna S., Tiangco A. and de Vera D. 2002 Bringing the Vertical Dimension to the Negotiating Table. Preliminary Assessment of a Conflict Resolution Case in the Philippines. ASEAN Biodiversity, Vol. 2 No. 1, 17–26. ASEAN Centre for Biodiversity Conservation (ARCBC), Los Baños, Philippines.
 Puginier O. 2002. “Participation” in a conflicting policy framework: Lessons learned from a Thai experience. ASEAN Biodiversity, Vol. 2 No. 1, 35–42. ASEAN Centre for Biodiversity Conservation (ARCBC), Los Baños, Philippines.
 Rambaldi G., and Le Van Lanh. 2002. The Seventh Helper: the Vertical Dimension. Feedback from a training exercise in Vietnam.  ASEAN Centre for Biodiversity Conservation (ARCBC), Los Baños, Philippines.
 Martin C., Eguienta Y., Castella, J.C., T.T. Hieu and Lecompte P. 2001. Combination of participatory landscape analysis and spatial graphic models as a common language between researchers and local stakeholders. SAM Paper Series. IRRI-IRD.

External links
Networks
Open Forum on Participatory Geographic Information Systems and Technologies – a global network of PGIS/PPGIS practitioners with Spanish, Portuguese and French-speaking chapters.
Indigenous Peoples of Africa Coordinating Committee (IPACC)

Organizations
Integrated Approaches to Participatory Development (IAPAD) – Provides information and case studies on Participatory 3-Dimensional Modelling (P3DM) practice.
The Philippine Association for Inter-Cultural Development (PAFID) uses Participatory 3D Modelling, GPS and GIS applications to support Indigenous Cultural Communities throughout the Philippines in claiming for their rights over ancestral domains.
ERMIS Africa builds capacities among local communities and development practitioners in using Participatory Geo-spatial Information Management Technologies.
The Technical Centre for Agricultural and Rural Cooperation ACP-EU (CTA) supports the dissemination of good PGIS practice, including P3DM in ACP countries.

Bibliography
Community Mapping, PGIS, PPGIS and P3DM Virtual Library

Multimedia
Collection of community mapping and participatory GIS multimedia
Giving Voice to the Unspoken a 20-minute video production showing the hands-on aspects of Participatory 3D Modelling (P3DM). 
PGIS Channel on Vimeo, including several documentaries on P3DM in English, French, Spanish and Portuguese

Geographic information systems
Human geography
Collaborative mapping
Neogeography